Mohamed Khaled Hassan (born 8 January 2003), is an Egyptian professional footballer who plays as a midfielder for Qatar Stars League side Al-Wakrah.

Career
Mohamed Khaled started his career at Al-Wakrah. is constantly playing with the Al-Wakrah U23, On 26 July 2020, Mohamed Khaled made his professional debut for Al-Wakrah against Al-Sailiya in the Pro League, replacing Omar Ali .

Career statistics

Club

Notes

References

External links

2003 births
Living people
Egyptian footballers
Egyptian expatriate footballers
Association football midfielders
Al-Wakrah SC players
Qatar Stars League players
Expatriate footballers in Qatar
Egyptian expatriate sportspeople in Qatar